Swarna Chitrakar (born 1974) is a Patachitra artist from Pingla, a changemaker and a community leader.

Early life
Chitrakar was born in 1974 in Naya village of West Midnapur of West Bengal. She learnt painting from her father but her parents married her off at her early age due to poverty. After marriage she took up paint and brush mainly to support her family. She stayed with her husband and 5 daughters. All of them are Patua.

Carrier
Chitrakar returned to her home, there she started Patachitra painting and started her journey as Patua. She learnt  scroll painting and Patua music from her father in his childhood.
She had showcased her art in the countries Australia, China, England, France, Germany, Sweden, and the United States. Swarna Chitrakar used her expertise pat painting with a melodic song for social cause like awareness about COVID-19. She used 7 scrolls to depict the current situation as well as COVID-forntline healthcare workers and awareness message like staying indoor and use of mask and washing hand when necessary. A video where she is singing and showing those Patachitra has been viewed more than 99,000 times on Facebook.

Social issue through Patachitra and Patua music
Chitrakar covers major incidents like Tsunami, September 11 attacks and social issues like Tuberculosis, HIV/AIDS, child marriage, trafficking of children and COVID-19 etc. through her Patachitra and her self composed Patua Sangeet.

Awards
 State level award in 1994

Books
Collodi, Carlo. The Patua Pinocchio. Illustrated by Swarna Chitrakar and translated by Carol Della Chiesa. publisher Tara Books;
Illustrated edition, May 12, 2015

References

External links
Story of Krishna and Radha by Swarna Chitrakar
Song and 7 long scroll Patachitra painting about COVID-19 by Swarna Chitrakar

1974 births
Living people
21st-century Indian women artists
Indian women painters
People from West Bengal
Women artists from West Bengal